The 2015 Czech Republic motorcycle Grand Prix was the eleventh round of the 2015 MotoGP season. It was held at the Masaryk Circuit in Brno on 16 August 2015.

In the premier class, Jorge Lorenzo took his second pole position of the season and ultimately his fifth win of the season, ahead of Marc Márquez and Valentino Rossi. Andrea Iannone finished fourth, while fifth place was contested by Andrea Dovizioso and Dani Pedrosa, with Pedrosa ultimately coming out on top by 0.075 seconds. Cal Crutchlow, Maverick Viñales, Alex de Angelis, and Eugene Laverty all crashed out of the race before the halfway mark. With these results, Lorenzo's win gave him the championship lead over Rossi, by virtue of more wins at that point.

In the junior classes, Moto2 championship leader Johann Zarco extended his lead in the championship, winning ahead of Tito Rabat and Álex Rins. In a restarted Moto3 race, Gresini Racing rider Niccolò Antonelli took his first victory ahead of Enea Bastianini and Brad Binder, with the top nine riders being split by 1.42 seconds at the finish.

Classification

MotoGP

Moto2

Moto3
The first attempt to run the race was interrupted following two separate accidents involving multiple riders. For the restart, the race distance was reduced from 19 to 12 laps.

Championship standings after the race (MotoGP)
Below are the standings for the top five riders and constructors after round eleven has concluded.

Riders' Championship standings

Constructors' Championship standings

Teams' Championship standings

 Note: Only the top five positions are included for all standings.

References

Czech
Motorcycle Grand Prix
Czech Republic motorcycle Grand Prix
Czech Republic motorcycle Grand Prix